Charles Joseph "Curry" Foley (January 16, 1856 – October 20, 1898) was an Irish born professional baseball player who played in the National League (NL) for five seasons from 1879 to 1883. He played as a pitcher, outfielder and first baseman for two teams in the NL; the Boston Red Caps (1879–80) and Buffalo Bisons (1881–83).

Early life
Foley was born Milltown, County Kerry, to Charles Foley (a farmer) and Betsy Gearin. His family emigrated to the United States, arriving in New York City on June 27, 1863.

Baseball career
Foley played in 337 games; 204 in the outfield, 69 as a pitcher, and 54 at first base. He compiled six home runs, 128 RBIs, and a .286 batting average as a batter, and posted a 27–27 win–loss record, 127 strikeouts and a 3.54 ERA as a pitcher in 442 innings pitched.

First major league cycle
On May 25, 1882, Foley became the first major league player to officially hit for the cycle. In a game against the Cleveland Blues, Foley hit a home run in the first inning, a triple in the second inning, a single in third inning and a double in the fifth inning.

Post-baseball life
On October 23, 1883, Foley became a naturalized citizen of the United States. Foley was working as a laborer, and listed as single when died at the age of 42 in Boston, Massachusetts. His cause of death was cirrhosis of the liver, and he is interred at Mount Cavalry Cemetery in Roslindale, Massachusetts.

See also
 List of Major League Baseball players to hit for the cycle
 List of players from Ireland in Major League Baseball

References

Further reading
 (box score of cycle game)

External links
, or Retrosheet

19th-century baseball players
Boston Red Caps players
Buffalo Bisons (NL) players
Major League Baseball outfielders
Major League Baseball pitchers
Major League Baseball players from Ireland
Irish baseball players
Sportspeople from County Kerry
1856 births
1898 deaths
Lowell (minor league baseball) players
Irish emigrants to the United States (before 1923)
Naturalized citizens of the United States